James Douglas Callahan (born August 24, 1994) is an American professional baseball pitcher who is a free agent. He has played in Major League Baseball (MLB) for the New York Mets.

Career
Callahan attended Dillon High School. He earned the 2012 Gatorade South Carolina Baseball Player of the Year and Region 8-2A Player of the Year in his senior season, after posting a 7–1 win–loss record with a 0.89 earned run average (ERA) and 111 strikeouts in 50 innings pitched to help his team reach the regional championship. In addition, he was an All-State selection in 2011 and 2012. Callahan committed to play college baseball for the South Carolina Gamecocks.

Boston Red Sox
The Boston Red Sox selected Callahan in the second round (87th overall) of the 2012 MLB Draft and he chose to forego his commitment to South Carolina in favor of a $565,500 signing bonus. He was assigned immediately to the Gulf Coast Red Sox where he was 1–0 with a 5.19 ERA in 8.2 innings pitched. In 2013 he pitched for the Lowell Spinners where he was 5–1 with a 3.92 ERA in 13 games (12 starts), in 2014 he played with the Greenville Drive where he pitched to a 3–13 record with a 6.96 ERA in 25 starts, and in 2015 he returned to Greenville where he was 7–6 with a 4.53 ERA in 31 games (six starts). Callahan spent 2016 with the Salem Red Sox where he posted a 5–3 record and 3.29 ERA in 36 relief appearances, and he began 2017 with the Portland Sea Dogs. He was promoted to the Pawtucket Red Sox in May.

New York Mets
On July 31, 2017, the New York Mets acquired Callahan, Stephen Nogosek, and Gerson Bautista in exchange for Addison Reed. New York assigned him to the Las Vegas 51s. The Mets promoted Callahan to the major leagues on September 1. In 41 relief appearances between Portland, Pawtucket, and Las Vegas prior to his promotion he was 6–3 with a 2.94 ERA. He made his Major League debut on September 2 against the Houston Astros at Minute Maid Park.

Callahan was assigned to Las Vegas to begin the 2018 season. He was placed on the disabled list in April and he underwent shoulder surgery in June, thus ending his season. He elected free agency on November 3, 2018.

San Francisco Giants
On December 28, 2018, Callahan signed a minor-league deal with the San Francisco Giants that included an invitation to spring training.

Callahan was released by the Giants in March 2020.

Chicago Dogs
On June 17, 2020, Callahan signed with the Chicago Dogs of the American Association. He was released on August 24, 2020. He struggled in 4 games going 0–1 with an 8.10 era and 2 strikeouts in 3.1 innings.

Gastonia Honey Hunters
On May 21, 2021, Callahan signed with the Gastonia Honey Hunters of the Atlantic League of Professional Baseball. He became a free agent following the season. He struggled in 26 games going 2–0 with a 7.04 era and 25 strikeouts in 23 innings.

Wild Health Genomes
On April 26, 2022, Callahan signed with the Wild Health Genomes of the Atlantic League of Professional Baseball. He appeared in 9 games going 1–0 with a 1.08 ERA and 7 strikeouts in 8.1 innings.

References

External links

1994 births
Living people
Sportspeople from Florence, South Carolina
Baseball players from South Carolina
Major League Baseball pitchers
New York Mets players
Gulf Coast Red Sox players
Lowell Spinners players
Greenville Drive players
Scottsdale Scorpions players
Salem Red Sox players
Surprise Saguaros players
Portland Sea Dogs players
Pawtucket Red Sox players
Las Vegas 51s players
Arizona League Giants players
San Jose Giants players
Richmond Flying Squirrels players
Sacramento River Cats players
Chicago Dogs players
Gastonia Honey Hunters players